"Arirang" is a Korean folk song.

Arirang may also refer to:

Broadcasting media
 Services of the Korea International Broadcasting Foundation:
 Arirang Arab
 Arirang Radio
 ArirangTV

Festivals
 Arirang Festival, North Korean mass games festival

Film
 Arirang (1926 film) and its sequels
Arirang geuhu iyagi (1930) and
 Arirang 3 (1936)
 Arirang (1954 film)
 Arirang (1968 film)
 Arirang (2003 film)
 Arirang (2011 film)

Music
 The Korean-Chinese Arirang Group

Technology
 The Arirang program of the South Korean Korea Aerospace Research Institute:
Arirang-1 (1999)
Arirang-2 (2006)
Arirang-3 (2012)
Arirang (smartphone), a North Korean smartphone